Hay was an electoral district in the Legislative Assembly of the Australian state of New South Wales created with the abolition of multi-member electorates in 1894, mainly from the abolished electoral district of Balranald, and named after and including the town of Hay. It was abolished in 1904, following the 1903 New South Wales referendum, which required the number of members of the Legislative Assembly to be reduced from 125 to 90. It was absorbed into the districts of The Murrumbidgee and Murray.

Members for Hay

Election results

References

Former electoral districts of New South Wales
1894 establishments in Australia
Constituencies established in 1894
1904 disestablishments in Australia
Constituencies disestablished in 1904